Einstein's Blackboard is a blackboard which physicist Albert Einstein (1879–1955) used on 16 May 1931 during his lectures while visiting the University of Oxford in England. The blackboard is in the collection of the Museum of the History of Science in Oxford.

Overview
The lecture in which the blackboard was used was the second of three, delivered at Rhodes House in South Parks Road. Einstein's visit to give the Rhodes Lectures, and also to receive an honorary Doctor of Science degree from Oxford University on 23 May 1931, was hosted by the physicist Frederick Lindemann. Einstein's first lecture was on relativity, the second on cosmology, and the third on unified field theory. All the lectures were delivered in German. A brief report of the second lecture was given in The Times and in Nature. A summary of all three lectures can be found in the Archives of the Oxford Museum for the History of Science.

The blackboard was rescued with another board by dons (including the chemist E. J. Bowen, zoologist Gavin de Beer, and historian of science Robert Gunther) and formally donated by the Warden of Rhodes House, Sir Francis James Wylie. The writing on the blackboard, although ephemeral in nature, is of historic interest because the equations displayed are taken from a model of the universe proposed by Einstein in May 1931 known as Friedmann–Einstein universe. The last three lines on the blackboard are estimates of the density of matter in the universe ρ, the radius of the universe P  and the timespan t of the expansion of the universe respectively ("L.J." on the blackboard indicates "light years" in German). It has recently been shown that these estimates contain a systematic numerical error.

The blackboard is considered a "mutant" object or artefact because it no longer serves the philosophical purpose of a blackboard, namely temporary information storage. By keeping Einstein's writings on it for ever, the blackboard became something else and can only regain to its original purpose by being wiped. A second blackboard used by Einstein during the lecture was also donated to the museum, but was accidentally wiped clean by a museum cleaner.

Einstein returned to Oxford again in 1932 and 1933 before he settled at Princeton University in the United States for the rest of his life.

The science of the blackboard
In 2013, it was pointed out that the equations on the Oxford blackboard had been taken directly from a key paper on relativistic cosmology written by Einstein in April 1931 and published in the Proceedings of the Royal Prussian Academy of Science on 9 May that year. The paper, known as the Friedmann–Einstein universe, is of historic significance because it constituted the first scientific publication in which Einstein embraced the possibility of a cosmos of time-varying radius. In the paper, Einstein adopts Alexander Friedman's 1922 analysis of relativistic models of a universe of time-varying radius and positive curvature, but sets the cosmological constant to zero, declaring it redundant, predicting a universe that expands and contracts over time. (The work is sometimes known as the Friedmann–Einstein model of the universe). With the use of Edwin Hubble's observations of a linear redshift/distance relation for the spiral nebulae, Einstein extracts from his model estimates of ρ ~ 10−26 g/cm3, P ~ 108 light-years and t ~ 1010 years for the density of matter, the radius of the cosmos and the timespan of the cosmic expansion respectively. These values are displayed in the last three lines on the Oxford blackboard (although the units of measurement are not specifically stated for the density estimate, cgs units are implied by the other calculations).

The role of the blackboard in clarifying an error
It has also been noted that the numerical estimates of cosmic parameters in Einstein's 1931 paper – and on the blackboard – contain a systematic error. Analysis of the 1931 paper shows that, given the contemporaneous Hubble constant of 500 km s−1Mpc−1, Einstein's estimates of cosmic density, radius and timespan should have been ρ ~ 10−28 g/cm3, P ~ 108 light-years and t ~ 109 years respectively. One line on the blackboard, not included in the published paper, makes the nature of Einstein's error clear. In the fourth line on the blackboard, Einstein obtains a value of 10−53 cm−2 for the quantity D2, defined in the top line of the blackboard as D = (1/c). (1/P).(dP/dt), i.e., the Hubble constant divided by the speed of light. Simple calculation shows that the contemporaneous value of the Hubble constant in fact implied a value of D2 ~ 10−55 cm−2 (or 10−51 m−2) for this quantity. It appears that Einstein stumbled in converting megaparsecs to cm, giving a density of matter that was too high by a factor of a hundred, a cosmic radius that was too low by a factor of ten, and a timespan for the expansion that was too high by a factor of ten. These errors were corrected in a later review of relativistic cosmology written by Einstein in 1945.

Nottingham blackboard
A blackboard used by Einstein in a public lecture at the University of Nottingham on 6 June 1930 was also preserved after the lecture and is now in the university's archives.

References

External links
 Einstein's Blackboard podcast
 Bye-bye blackboard ... from Einstein and others
 Photo: Einstein's blackboard, TripAdvisor, 2014
 Oxford – Einstein's blackboard, Flickr, 2013
 Hidden Oxford – Einstein's Blackboard, BlogSpot, 2011
 Einstein’s Blackboard, IELTS
 Einstein objects in the collection of the Museum of the History of Science, Oxford

1931 works
1931 in England
1931 in science
Blackboard
Works by Albert Einstein
History of the University of Oxford
Culture of the University of Oxford
Collections of museums in the United Kingdom
Rhodes House
Science and technology in Oxfordshire
History of physics
Equations
Ephemera